The Belgium national badminton team represents Belgium in international badminton team competitions and is controlled by the Royal Belgian Badminton Federation. The Belgium national team have never qualified for the Thomas Cup and the Uber Cup. The last time Belgium competed in the Sudirman Cup was in 2007.

Belgium also competes in the European Games. The team competed in the Helvetia Cup.

Participation in BWF competitions

Sudirman Cup

Participation in European Team Badminton Championships

Men's Team

Women's Team

Mixed Team

Participation in Helvetia Cup 
The Helvetia Cup or European B Team Championships was a European mixed team championship in badminton. The first Helvetia Cup tournament took place in Zurich, Switzerland in 1962. The tournament took place every two years from 1971 until 2007, after which it was dissolved. Belgium were runners-up in the 1964 Helvetia Cup.

Participation in European Junior Team Badminton Championships
Mixed Team

Current squad 
The following players were selected to represent Belgium at the 2020 European Men's and Women's Team Badminton Championships.

Male players
Maxime Moreels
Elias Bracke
Julien Carraggi
Rowan Scheurkogel
Senne Houthoofd
Jona van Nieuwkerke
Freek Golinski
Floris Oleffe

Female players
Lianne Tan
Flore Vandenhoucke
Clara Lassaux
Kirstin Boonen
Lise Jaques
Joke de Langhe
Siebelijn de Sutter
Lien Lammertyn

References

Badminton
National badminton teams
Badminton in Belgium